3rd Street Tunnel may refer to:
 3rd Street Tunnel (Los Angeles)
 3rd Street Tunnel (District of Columbia), part of the route of Interstate 395 (Virginia–District of Columbia)